Nina Grishchenkova is a retired Russian rowing coxswain who won two European titles in the eights in 1963 and 1965.

References

Year of birth missing (living people)
Living people
Russian female rowers
Coxswains (rowing)
Soviet female rowers
European Rowing Championships medalists